A water cannon is a device that shoots a high-velocity stream of water. Typically, a water cannon can deliver a large volume of water, often over dozens of meters. They are used in firefighting, large vehicle washing, riot control, and mining. Most water cannons fall under the category of a fire monitor.

Firefighting

Water cannons were first devised for use on fireboats. Extinguishing fires on boats and buildings near the water was much more difficult and dangerous before fireboats were invented. The first fireboat deployed in Los Angeles was commissioned on 1 August 1919. The first fireboat in New York City was Marine 1, deployed 1 February 1891. There may have been other fireboats elsewhere even earlier.

Fire trucks deliver water with much the same force and volume as water cannons, and have even been used in riot control situations, but are rarely referred to as water cannons outside this context.

Riot control

The first truck-mounted water cannon was used for riot control in Germany in the beginning of the 1930s.

The most modern versions do not expose the operator to the riot, and are controlled remotely from within the vehicle by a joystick. The Austrian-built WaWe 10.000 by Rosenbauer used by German police can carry  of water, which can deploy water in all directions via three cannons, all of which are remotely controlled from inside the vehicle by a joystick.

Water cannons designed for riot control are still made in the United States and the United Kingdom, but most products are exported, particularly to Africa and parts of Asia such as Indonesia.

Safety
Use of water cannon in riot control contexts can lead to injury or death, with fatalities recorded in Indonesia (in 1996, when the cannon's payload contained ammonia), Zimbabwe (in 2007, when the use of cannons on a peaceful crowd caused panic), Turkey (in 2013, when the payload was laced with "liquid tear gas"), Ukraine (in 2014, with the death of activist and businessman Bogdan Kalynyak, reportedly catching pneumonia after being sprayed by a water cannon in freezing temperatures) and South Korea (in 2016, when a 68-year-old farmer died after injuries sustained by a water cannon the previous year).
Water cannons in use during the 1960s, which were generally adapted fire trucks, would knock protesters down and on occasion, tear their clothes.

On 30 September 2010, during a protest demonstration against the Stuttgart 21 project in Germany, a demonstrator was hit in the face by a water cannon. Dietrich Wagner, a retired engineer, suffered damage to his eyelids and retinas, resulting in near-complete loss of his eyesight. Graphic imagery was recorded of the event, sparking a national debate about police brutality and proportionality in the use of state force.

According to a report issued in the United Kingdom, using plastic bullets instead of water cannons was justified because the latter "are inflexible and indiscriminate", although several people had previously been killed or seriously injured by plastic bullets.

Media effect
The presence of the media at riots has had a significant impact on water cannon use. There is much pressure on police departments to avoid bad publicity, and water cannons often play badly in the press. It is considered that this is a likely reason that they are not used more often in some countries.

Confrontations that took place in the era of the American Civil Rights Movement, where water cannons were used by authorities to disperse crowds of protesting African Americans, has led to the demise of water cannons in the United States.

Alternative payload

Dye
In 1997, pink dye was reportedly added to the water used by South Korean and Indonesian police to disperse a riot. The implication is that they might use this mark to make it easier to arrest rioters later. The United Kingdom, which had sold the water cannon to Indonesia, condemned this practice (although the Royal Ulster Constabulary had used a water cannon with purple dye during The Troubles in Northern Ireland) but later approved the sale of further water cannons to them. Most modern water cannons are also capable of adding tear gas to the stream.

Electrified water jet
In 2004, Jaycor Tactical Systems was experimenting with additives (salt and additives to reduce the breakup of the stream into droplets) that would allow electricity to be conducted through water.

Although referred to as an electrified water cannon, this experiment involved a water jet much less powerful than a water cannon.

Other types
Water cannon differ from other similar devices in the volume of water delivered in a given time, the nozzle speed, the pressure that it is delivered at, and to a lesser extent the total volume that can be delivered. They are also generally portable. The method of employment is also important in labeling a device a water cannon. Nevertheless, the distinction between a water cannon and other similar devices is fuzzy. For example:-
Pressure washers generally produce an extremely high pressure stream where the power of the stream drops off significantly over a very short distance.
Water pistols and other toys deliver much lower volumes of water at a much lower pressure.
Ultra high pressure water jet cutters are used to cut a wide variety of materials including granite, concrete (see hydrodemolition), ceramics, fabric and even Kevlar. One such cutter delivers  through a nozzle 0.003 inch (76 micrometres) in diameter at 1 kilometre per second, which can cut a person at a close range. There are reports of accidental deaths involving the industrial use of high-pressure water.

Usage
Water cannon are still in large scale use in Chile, Belgium, the Netherlands and other parts of the world.

Australia
The State of New South Wales in Australia purchased a water cannon in 2007, with a view to using it during an APEC meeting in Sydney that year. It was not used. It was the first purchase of a water cannon in Australia.

Germany

The annual riots on 1 May in Berlin, the Schanzenfest fair in Hamburg, which regularly ends in riots, or other demonstrations, are usually accompanied by water cannon, which support riot police. The most commonly used water cannon in Germany over years was the Wasserwerfer 9000. Since 2019, the only water cannon type used by riot police, which are around 50 units in total, is the Wasserwerfer 10000.

Hong Kong

Three truck-mounted water cannon, officially known as 'Specialised Crowd Management Vehicles', were purchased by Hong Kong Police from France in mid-2018. The truck chassis were provided by Mercedes Benz and the water spray devices were also made by German firm Ziegler. The three water cannon cost HK$27 million to purchase, a sum that was criticised as overpriced. The vehicles were frequently used by police on participants and bystanders during the 2019–20 Hong Kong protests. Blue dye was often added to the water to allow police to identify protesters. Pepper spray solution was also an ingredient.

On 20 October 2019, police used a water cannon to target and shoot a small group of pedestrians standing outside Kowloon Mosque, in Tsim Sha Tsui, using blue-dyed water mixed with a pepper solution. A large number of Hong Kong residents spontaneously went to the scene to clean up, with the incident resulting in an increased sense of inclusiveness among the Hong Kong public toward the city's Muslim and other minorities.

Thailand 
During the 2020 Thai protests, on 16 October 2020, the police used water cannon claimed to have water containing an irritant that made protesters' eyes sting to disperse a peaceful protest in Bangkok.

Turkey
The Turkish police water cannon TOMA has been used against protestors many times, including the 2013 protests in Turkey, and are often present at protests of all sizes.

United Kingdom
Only six water cannons are operational in the United Kingdom, all held by the Police Service of Northern Ireland and built by GINAF. Water cannon use outside Northern Ireland is not approved, and would require the statutory authorisation of Parliament in England, or of the devolved assemblies in Wales and the parliament of Scotland. In June 2014, London's Deputy Mayor for Policing and Crime Stephen Greenhalgh authorised the Metropolitan Police to buy three second-hand Wasserwerfer 9000s from the German Federal Police. Mayor of London Boris Johnson said that the purchase had been authorised before Parliamentary approval, as the three cannons cost £218,000 to purchase and would require a further £125,000 of work before being deemed suitable for service, as opposed to £870,000 for a single new machine. But after a study of their safety and effectiveness, Home Secretary Theresa May said in Parliament in July 2015 that she had decided not to license them for use. They were sold in November 2018 with the intention that they were to be broken up for spare parts.

United States
Truck-based water cannon, and fire hoses used as improvised water cannons, were used widely in the United States during the 1960s for both riot control and suppressing peaceful civil rights marches, including the infamous use ordered by Eugene "Bull" Connor in Birmingham, Alabama in 1963. The newsreel footage of police turning water cannons and police dogs on civilians—both student protesters and bystanders alike, including children as young as six—widely viewed as shocking and inappropriate and helped turn public sympathies towards civil rights. Water cannons were used in November 2016 during the Dakota Access Pipeline protests. In August 2020, state senator Floyd Prozanski suggested water cannons be used by police against protesters in Portland, Oregon.

Mining

Water cannons are used in hydraulic mining to dislodge rock material or move sediment. In the placer mining of gold or tin, the resulting water-sediment slurry is directed through sluice boxes to remove the gold. It is also used in mining kaolin and coal.

Gallery

Other meanings
The term "water cannon" could also refer to:-
Similar land vehicles used for firefighting
Numerous large toys, for example images
Waterjet in hydraulic mining
A type of railway wagon used to remove fallen leaves off the track: e.g. seen at Alexandra Palace on 25 October 2003
Tool for powerwashing large construction equipment.

See also
Non-lethal weapon
Water gun
Riot police

References

Non-lethal weapons
Police weapons
Riot control weapons
Water